Yedikuleli Seyyid Abdullah Efendi ( Modern Turkish: Yedikuleli Seyyid Abdullah Efendi) (1670-1731) was an Ottoman master calligrapher.

Life and career
Born Hâşimîzâde Abdullah Efendi in 1670 in Istanbul, his father was Sayyid Hassan al-Hashimite, the imam of Imrahor Mosque. He was born into a family of calligraphers and grew up in the 'Yedikuleli' district from which he derived the nickname. He was descended from the prophet, Mohammed through both his paternal and maternal line, which allowed him to use the title of Seyyid. He studied calligraphy with the great master, Hâfiz Osman.

He became a court calligrapher and was a favourite of Sultan Ahmed III. He was appointed as the instructor of calligraphy at the Topkapi Palace in 1708, where he taught Egrikapili Mehmed Rasim Efendi. He wrote many copies of the Qur'an.

At one point Ahmed III was so intrigued by the ink that Seyyid used in his calligraphy, that he sent a messenger to learn the secret. Seyyid sent back a full inkwell with the messenger. When the Sultan received the gift, he reportedly emptied the ink, refilled the inkwell with gold, and sent it back.

See also
Culture of the Ottoman Empire
Islamic calligraphy
List of Ottoman calligraphers 
Ottoman art

References

Ottoman culture
Calligraphers from the Ottoman Empire
1731 deaths
18th-century artists from the Ottoman Empire